Fire Station No. 16 may refer to:

Fire Station No. 16 (Birmingham, Alabama), listed on the NRHP in Alabama
Engine Company 16 Fire Station, Hartford, CT, NRHP-listed
Engine House No. 16 (Columbus, Ohio), NRHP-listed
Dayton Fire Department Station No. 16, Dayton, OH, NRHP-listed
Dallas Fire Station No. 16, Dallas, TX, NRHP-listed
Engine Company 16-Truck Company 3, Washington, D.C., NRHP-listed

See also
List of fire stations